The 1990 Rice Owls football team was an American football team that represented Rice University in the Southwest Conference during the 1990 NCAA Division I-A football season. In their second year under head coach Fred Goldsmith, the team compiled a 5–6 record.

Schedule

References

Rice
Rice Owls football seasons
Rice Owls football